Friess is a surname. Notable people with the surname include:

Aline Friess (born 2003), French artistic gymnast
Donna Lewis Friess (born 1943), American author and activist
Foster Friess (1940–2021), American investment manager
Horace L. Friess (1900–1975), American ethicist
Jörg Friess (born 1968), German triple-jumper
Katherine Friess, American attorney who worked on efforts to overturn 2020 election

See also
Fries (surname)
Friesz, surname

Ethnonymic surnames